The Sigmund H. Danziger Jr. Memorial Lecture in the Humanities is an annual honorary bestowed upon an “established scholar of classical literature, who has made substantial contributions to the critical analysis of classical literature, or has been exceptionally skilled at inspiring an appreciation for classical literature” by the Humanities Division of the University of Chicago.

Sigmund H Danziger Jr. (1916-1979) founded Homak Mfg. Co. Inc. in 1947 in Chicago.  A Chicago southsider and son of a sales representative for houseware products, including bathroom scales, Mr. Danziger began his business career “jobbing” for Chicago manufacturers while a student at the University of Chicago (graduated 1937). After the World War II, in which he served as a captain and translator, he purchased a bathroom cabinet manufacturer on the south side of Chicago for which he was jobbing. Naming the new company Homak, capturing a sign he noted on a hat store, he began manufacturing steel kitchen cabinets and rapidly moved to a  building, which he designed at 4433 S. Springfield Ave in Chicago. In the early 1960s, an order for tool boxes lead to the production of a hardware line including roller cabinets, tool boxes, and other accessories. Through the 1970s and 1980s, most of the major retailers and chains of the time became either line or private label customers at one time or another, including Sears, Walmart, Kmart, Lowe's, The Home Depot True Value, Ace Hardware, Montgomery Ward, Coast-to-Coast, Costco, Meijer, Pep Boys, Fingerhut, NAPA, etc.  In 1979, Sigmund Danziger died and his wife Gertrude (Trudy)(1919-2021), who was known as "The Toolbox Lady" in the hardware industry, ran the company for the next 25 years.   During this time, the company moved to a  facility in Bedford Park, Illinois at 5151 W 73rd St. while sales grew to over $100,000,000 with hardware, automotive, hospital (under Homed TM), and sporting goods lines. One of the major innovations during this period was the introduction of a consumer gun cabinet (under HomSafe TM), which instantly grew to be a major hit at mass retailers, including Bass Pro Shops, Gander Mountain, Dick's Sporting Goods and Sports Authority. Also a line of garage cabinets was introduced for Whirlpool and Sears under the label "Gladiator Garageworks." Homak employed hundreds of people, who enjoyed the prosperity of the industry, and was the largest privately held sheet-metal fabricator in America.

List of Sigmund H. Danziger Jr. lecturers 

 2021-2022. David Wengrow
 2020-2021. Judith Butler
 2019-2020 William Johnson 
 2018-2019. Fiona Macintosh
 2017-2018      Marina Warner
 2016-2017. Simon Schama
 2015–2016      Daniel Boyarin
 2014–2015      Stephen Greenblatt
 2013–2014      John T. Hamilton
 2012–2013      Julia Annas 
 2011–2012. C. Brian Rose
 2010–2011      Anthony Grafton 
 2009–2010	Page DuBois 
 2008–2009	Elaine Pagels 
 2007–2008	Mary Beard
 2006–2007	Daniel Mendelsohn
 2005–2006	Jacques Rancière 
 2004–2005	Andrew Ford
 2003–2004	Steven Feld 
 2002–2003	Josiah Ober 
 2001–2002	Ian Hacking 
 2000–2001	Simon Goldhill
 1999–2000	David Shulman
 1998–1999	Joan E. DeJean
 1997–1998	Mary Poovey
 1996–1997	Peter Brown
 1995–1996	Irene J. Winter 
 1994–1995	Charles Segal
 1993–1994	Friedrich Kittler
 1992–1993	Gary A. Tomlinson 
 1991–1992	Hazel Carby 
 1990–1991	Naomi Schor
 1989–1990	Natalie Zemon Davis
 1988–1989	Kenneth Dover

References

External links
 Official site

Josiah Ober
Ian Hacking
Peter Brown (historian)
Anthony Grafton

David Wengrow

Sigmund H. Danziger Jr. Memorial Lecture in the Humanities